Obesity in Italy has been increasingly cited as a major health issue in recent years. 

Overall, the Italians, along with the French and the Swiss, are considered among the slimmest people in Europe on average. In 2011, Italy was the only country in Europe where the average weight dropped.

Causes
Causes are the Mediterranean diet and lifestyle choices such as exercise and getting enough sleep. However, obesity rates in Italian two-year-olds are the highest in Europe with a rate of 42%.

Effects
Several studies have shown that obese men tend to have a lower sperm count, fewer rapidly mobile sperm and fewer progressively motile sperm compared to normal-weight men.

Programs
Scientists from the University of Verona designed a new type of park to help deal with obesity in Italian children, in which an adult trainer is in charge and the children follow a series of organised exercises. All children are under six years old, and the cost of the playground was $250,000.

See also 
 Health in Italy

References

Italy
Health in Italy